Agios Andronikos ( "Saint Andronicus [of Kanakaria]";  "green village") is a village between Leonarisso and Gialousa, on the Karpass Peninsula, in Cyprus. It is under the de facto control of Northern Cyprus.

Prior to 1974, Agios Andronikos had a mixed Greek- and Turkish Cypriot population. The Greek Cypriots constituted a majority. Though only a small number of the village's Greek Cypriot inhabitants fled during the Turkish invasion of Cyprus, nearly all of them left for the south of the island by mid-1976. , Agios Andronikos had a population of 799.

References

Communities in Famagusta District
Populated places in İskele District